Macken is a surname, and may refer to:

 Eddie Macken (born 1949), Irish equestrian
 Eoin Macken (born 1983), Irish actor and model
 Fidelma Macken (born 1942), Irish judge
 John Macken (c.1784–1823), Irish poet
 Jon Macken (born 1977), football manager
 Peter Macken (born 1938), Australian modern pentathlete and fencer
 Walter Macken (1915–1963), Irish writer

See also
 Macken, County Fermanagh, a hamlet in Northern Ireland
 Machen (surname)

Surnames